Jean Marsan (7 April 1920 – 29 September 1977) was a French screenwriter and actor. He was co-nominated for the Academy Award for Best Story for the film The Sheep Has Five Legs (1954).

Selected filmography 
 The Secret of Monte Cristo (1948)
 Forbidden to the Public (1949)
 The Girl from Maxim's (1950)
 Women of Paris (1953)
 Bonjour sourire (1956)
 The Seventh Commandment (1957)
 All the Gold in the World (1961)
 Coplan Takes Risks (1964)

External links

References 

French male screenwriters
20th-century French screenwriters
1920 births
1977 deaths
Troupe of the Comédie-Française
20th-century French male writers